Sitafloxacin (INN; also called DU-6859a) is a fluoroquinolone antibiotic that shows promise in the treatment of Buruli ulcer. The molecule was identified by Daiichi Sankyo Co., which brought ofloxacin and levofloxacin to the market.  Sitafloxacin is currently marketed in Japan by Daiichi Sankyo under the tradename Gracevit.

See also 
 Quinolone

References

Further reading

External links 
  Gracevit グレースビット (PDF) Daiichi Sankyo Co. January 2008.

Fluoroquinolone antibiotics
Chloroarenes
Cyclopropanes
Organofluorides
Spiro compounds
Daiichi Sankyo